The ant fauna of Australia is large and diverse. As of 1999, Australia and its external territories represent 1,275 described taxa (subspecies included) divided into 103 genera and 10 subfamilies. No publication since 1999 has estimated the current diversity of Australia's ant fauna, although it has considerably increased in size as the total amount of subfamilies in Australia today is around twelve. Very few species in the country are known to be invasive.

Australia is home to two-thirds of the world's subfamilies, one-third of known genera, 15% of all described species, and some genera found in Australia can be found nowhere else or they are found in neighboring countries instead. Australia's ant diversity is smaller than Central America, South America and Southeast Asia, it has roughly the same number of genera and species as the Orient and surpasses the amount of ants known in Europe, North America, Northern Asia and Northern Africa. The state of Queensland has the greatest diversity of ants in the world, with more than 1,400 species known within its borders. The total amount of species known in Australia could possibly be over 6,500, with only one in five ants being described.



Subfamilies
In 1999, 10 ant subfamilies were known to reside in Australia, but some of these subfamilies were later synonymised under the subfamily Dorylinae. Today, 12 subfamilies are known to occur in Australia, including Amblyoponinae, Dolichoderinae, Dorylinae, Ectatomminae, Formicinae, Heteroponerinae, Leptanillinae, Myrmeciinae, Myrmicinae, Ponerinae, Proceratiinae and Pseudomyrmecinae.

The subfamily Myrmicinae is the largest in Australia in terms of both number of genera and species, as well as the subfamily Formicinae, which is also one of the most common subfamily of ants to be encountered. The subfamily Myrmeciinae consists of two genera which are only found in Australia, with the exception of a single species native to New Caledonia. Only a single species of the subfamily Leptanillinae is known from Australia.

Acropyga

Acropyga acutiventris Roger, 1862
Acropyga myops Forel, 1910
Acropyga pallida (Donisthorpe, 1938)

Adlerzia
Adlerzia froggatti (Forel, 1902) – Thumbelina ant

Aenictus

Aenictus acerbus Shattuck, 2008
Aenictus aratus Forel, 1900 – Black lesser army ant
Aenictus diclops Shattuck, 2008
Aenictus hilli Clark, 1928
Aenictus nesiotis Wheeler and Chapman, 1930
Aenictus philiporum Wilson, 1964
Aenictus prolixus Shattuck, 2008
Aenictus turneri Forel, 1900

Amblyopone

Amblyopone aberrans Wheeler, 1927
Amblyopone australis Erichson, 1842 – Southern Michelin ant
Amblyopone clarki Wheeler, 1927
Amblyopone ferruginea Smith, 1858
Amblyopone gingivalis Brown, 1960
Amblyopone hackeri Wheeler, 1927
Amblyopone leae Wheeler, 1927
Amblyopone longidens Forel, 1910
Amblyopone mercovichi Brown, 1960
Amblyopone michaelseni Forel, 1907

Anochetus
References:

Anochetus alae Shattuck & Slipinska, 2012
Anochetus armstrongi McAreavey, 1949
Anochetus avius Shattuck & Slipinska, 2012
Anochetus graeffei Mayr, 1870
Anochetus isolatus Mann, 1919
Anochetus paripungens Brown, 1978
Anochetus rectangularis Mayr, 1876
Anochetus renatae Shattuck & Slipinska, 2012
Anochetus rufolatus Shattuck & Slipinska, 2012
Anochetus rufostenus Shattuck & Slipinska, 2012
Anochetus turneri Forel, 1900
Anochetus veronicae Shattuck & Slipinska, 2012
Anochetus victoriae Shattuck & Slipinska, 2012
Anochetus wiesiae Shattuck & Slipinska, 2012

Anonychomyrma

References:

Anonychomyrma arcadia (Forel, 1915)
Anonychomyrma biconvexa (Santschi, 1928) – Forest black cocktail ant
Anonychomyrma fornicata (Emery, 1914)
Anonychomyrma froggatti (Forel, 1902)
Anonychomyrma gilberti (Forel, 1902) – Golden-black cocktail ant
Anonychomyrma itinerans (Lowne, 1865)
Anonychomyrma longiceps (Forel, 1907)
Anonychomyrma malandana (Forel, 1915)
Anonychomyrma nitidiceps (André, 1896)
Anonychomyrma procidua (Erichson, 1842)
Anonychomyrma purpurescens (Lowne, 1865)

Anoplolepis
References:
Anoplolepis gracilipes (Smith, 1857) – introduced species – Crazy ant

Aphaenogaster

Aphaenogaster barbara Shattuck, 2008
Aphaenogaster barbigula Wheeler, 1916 – Desert funnel ant
Aphaenogaster kimberleyensis Shattuck, 2008
Aphaenogaster longiceps (Smith, 1858) – Forest funnel ant
Aphaenogaster mediterrae Shattuck, 2008
Aphaenogaster poultoni Crawley, 1922 
Aphaenogaster pythia Forel, 1915
Aphaenogaster reichelae Shattuck, 2008

Arnoldius
Arnoldius flavus (Crawley, 1922)
Arnoldius pusillus (Mayr, 1876)
Arnoldius scissor (Crawley, 1922)

Austromorium
Austromorium flavigaster (Clark, 1938)
Austromorium hetericki Shattuck, 2009

Austroponera
References:
Austroponera rufonigra (Clark, 1934)

Brachyponera
Brachyponera croceicornis (Emery, 1900)
Brachyponera lutea (Mayr, 1862)

Calomyrmex 
References:
Calomyrmex albertisi (Emery, 1887)
Calomyrmex albopilosus (Mayr, 1876)
Calomyrmex glauerti Clark, 1930
Calomyrmex impavidus (Forel, 1893) – Black beauty ant
Calomyrmex purpureus (Mayr, 1876) – Speckled beauty ant
Calomyrmex similis (Mayr, 1876)
Calomyrmex splendidus (Mayr, 1876) – Bauble beauty ant

Calyptomyrmex
Calyptomyrmex beccarii Emery, 1887
Calyptomyrmex fragarus Shattuck, 2011
Calyptomyrmex fritillus  Shattuck, 2011
Calyptomyrmex grammus Shattuck, 2011
Calyptomyrmex lineolus  Shattuck, 2011
Calyptomyrmex ocullatus Shattuck, 2011
Calyptomyrmex sparsus  Shattuck, 2011
Calyptomyrmex taylori Shattuck, 2011

Camponotus

References:

Camponotus adami Forel, 1910
Camponotus aeneopilosus Mayr, 1862 – Golden-tailed sugar ant
Camponotus afflatus Viehmeyer, 1925
Camponotus anderseni McArthur & Shattuck, 2001
Camponotus andyyoungi McArthur, 2008
Camponotus annetteae McArthur & Shattuck, 2001
Camponotus arcuatus Mayr, 1876
Camponotus arenatus Shattuck & McArthur, 2002
Camponotus armstrongi McAreavey, 1949
Camponotus aurocinctus (Smith, 1858) – Golden bearded sugar ant
Camponotus bigenus Santschi, 1919
Camponotus cameratus Viehmeyer, 1925
Camponotus capito Mayr, 1876
Camponotus ceriseipes Clark, 1938 – Southern bearded sugar ant
Camponotus chalceoides Clark, 1938
Camponotus chalceus Crawley, 1915
Camponotus chloroticus Emery, 1897
Camponotus christmasensis McArthur, 2008
Camponotus churchetti McArthur, 2008
Camponotus cinereus Mayr, 1876 – Mallee black sugar ant
Camponotus clarior Forel, 1902
Camponotus claripes Mayr, 1876 – Pale legged sugar ant
Camponotus conithorax Emery, 1914
Camponotus consectator (Smith, 1858)
Camponotus consobrinus (Erichson, 1842) – Banded sugar ant/Sugar ant
Camponotus cowlei Froggatt, 1896 
Camponotus crenatus Mayr, 1876
Camponotus crozieri McArthur & Leys, 2006
Camponotus darlingtoni Wheeler, 1934
Camponotus discors Forel, 1902 – Yellow disc sugar ants
Camponotus donnellani Shattuck & McArthur, 2002
Camponotus dromas Santschi, 1919
Camponotus dryandrae McArthur & Adams, 1996
Camponotus eastwoodi McArthur & Adams, 1996
Camponotus elegans Forel, 1902
Camponotus ephippium (Smith, 1858) – Jumbuck sugar ant
Camponotus eremicus Wheeler, 1915
Camponotus esau Forel, 1915
Camponotus evae Forel, 1910 – Black disc sugar ant
Camponotus extensus Mayr, 1876
Camponotus ezotus Bolton, 1995
Camponotus fergusoni McArthur, 2003
Camponotus fieldeae Forel, 1902
Camponotus fieldellus Forel, 1910
Camponotus fraseri McArthur, 2008
Camponotus froggatti Forel, 1902
Camponotus gasseri (Forel, 1894) – Southern plug ant
Camponotus gibbinotus Forel, 1902
Camponotus gouldianus Forel, 1922
Camponotus guidae McArthur, 2007
Camponotus hartogi Forel, 1902
Camponotus horni Clark, 1930
Camponotus howensis Wheeler, 1927 – Lord Howe Island rectangle plug ant
Camponotus humilior Forel, 1902 – Household sugar ant
Camponotus inflatus Lubbock, 1880 – Australian honey-pot ant
Camponotus innexus Forel, 1902 – Antarctic sugar ant
Camponotus insipidus Forel, 1893
Camponotus intrepidus (Kirby, 1818) – Coastal flumed sugar ant
Camponotus janeti Forel, 1895
Camponotus janforrestae McArthur & Shattuck, 2001
Camponotus johnclarki Taylor, 1992
Camponotus judithmorrisae McArthur, 2008
Camponotus leae Wheeler, 1915
Camponotus lividicoxis Viehmeyer, 1925
Camponotus longideclivis McArthur & Adams, 1995
Camponotus longifacies McArthur, 2003
Camponotus loweryi McArthur & Adams, 1996
Camponotus lownei Forel, 1895
Camponotus macareaveyi Taylor, 1992
Camponotus mackayensis Forel, 1902
Camponotus malleensis McArthur, 2007
Camponotus marcens Forel, 1907
Camponotus michaelseni Forel, 1907
Camponotus minimus Crawley, 1922
Camponotus molossus Forel, 1907 – Western flumed sugar ant
Camponotus nigriceps (Smith, 1858) – Black-headed sugar ant
Camponotus nigroaeneus (Smith, 1858) – Southern black sugar ant
Camponotus novaehollandiae Mayr, 1870 – Northern common sugar ant
Camponotus oetkeri Forel, 1910
Camponotus owensae Shattuck & McArthur, 2002
Camponotus oxleyi Forel, 1902
Camponotus palkura McArthur, 2007
Camponotus pallidiceps Emery, 1887
Camponotus pawseyi McArthur, 2003
Camponotus pellax Santschi, 1919 – Silver sugar ant
Camponotus perjurus Shattuck & McArthur, 2002
Camponotus peseshus Bolton, 1995
Camponotus philwardi McArthur, 2008
Camponotus piliventris (Smith, 1858)
Camponotus pitjantjatarae McArthur, 2003
Camponotus postcornutus Clark, 1930
Camponotus prosseri Shattuck & McArthur, 2002
Camponotus prostans Forel, 1910 – Western sugar ant
Camponotus punctiventris Emery, 1920
Camponotus rubiginosus Mayr, 1876 – Coconut sugar ants
Camponotus rudis McArthur, 2003
Camponotus rufonigrus Shattuck & McArthur, 2002
Camponotus rufus Crawley, 1925
Camponotus samueli McArthur, 2008
Camponotus sanguinifrons Viehmeyer, 1925
Camponotus scotti McArthur, 2003
Camponotus scratius Forel, 1907
Camponotus setosus Shattuck & McArthur, 2002
Camponotus simpsoni McArthur, 2003
Camponotus simulator Forel, 1915
Camponotus spenceri Clark, 1930
Camponotus spinitarsus Emery, 1920
Camponotus sponsorum Forel, 1910
Camponotus stefani McArthur, 2007
Camponotus subnitidus Mayr, 1876 – Aerial sugar ant
Camponotus suffusus (Smith, 1858)  – Golden flumed sugar ant
Camponotus tasmani Forel, 1902
Camponotus terebrans (Lowne, 1865) – Brown bearded sugar ant
Camponotus thadeus Shattuck, 2005
Camponotus tricoloratus Clark, 1941
Camponotus triodiae McArthur, 2009
Camponotus tristis Clark, 1930
Camponotus tumidus Crawley, 1922
Camponotus versicolor Clark, 1930
Camponotus vitreus (Smith, 1860) – Common northern plug ant
Camponotus walkeri Forel, 1893
Camponotus whitei Wheeler, 1915 – Common armoured sugar ant
Camponotus wiederkehri Forel, 1894 – Moneybox sugar ant
Camponotus woodroffeensis McArthur, 2008
Camponotus xuthus Emery, 1925

Cardiocondyla
References:
Cardiocondyla atalanta Forel, 1915
Cardiocondyla emeryi Forel, 1881
Cardiocondyla nuda (Mayr, 1866)
Cardiocondyla thoracica (Smith, 1859)
Cardiocondyla wroughtonii (Forel, 1890)

Carebara
References:
Carebara affinis (Jerdon, 1851)
Carebara atoma (Emery, 1900)
Carebara cornigera (Forel, 1902)
Carebara crassiuscula (Emery, 1900)
Carebara mjobergi (Forel, 1915)
Carebara norfolkensis (Donisthorpe, 1941)

Colobopsis
Colobopsis macrocephala (Erichson, 1842) – Southern rectangle plug ant
Colobopsis explodens

Colobostruma
References:

Colobostruma alinodis (Forel, 1913)
Colobostruma australis Brown, 1959
Colobostruma biconcava Shattuck, 2000
Colobostruma biconvexa Shattuck, 2000
Colobostruma bicorna Shattuck, 2000
Colobostruma cerornata Brown, 1959
Colobostruma elliotti (Clark, 1928)
Colobostruma froggatti (Forel, 1913)
Colobostruma lacuna Shattuck, 2000
Colobostruma leae (Wheeler, 1927)
Colobostruma mellea Shattuck, 2000
Colobostruma nancyae Brown, 1965
Colobostruma papulata Brown, 1965
Colobostruma sisypha Shattuck, 2000
Colobostruma unicorna Shattuck, 2000

Crematogaster
References:

Crematogaster australis Mayr, 1876 – Valentine ant
Crematogaster cornigera Forel, 1902
Crematogaster dispar Forel, 1902
Crematogaster eurydice Forel, 1915
Crematogaster frivola Forel, 1902
Crematogaster fusca Mayr, 1876
Crematogaster kutteri Viehmeyer, 1924
Crematogaster laeviceps Smith, 1858 – Common valentine ant
Crematogaster longicephala Özdikmen, 2010
Crematogaster mjobergi Forel, 1915
Crematogaster pallida Lowne, 1865
Crematogaster pallipes Mayr, 1862
Crematogaster pythia Forel, 1915
Crematogaster queenslandica Forel, 1902 – Little valentine ant
Crematogaster rufotestacea Mayr, 1876
Crematogaster scita Forel, 1902
Crematogaster whitei Wheeler, 1915
Crematogaster xerophila Wheeler, 1915

Cryptopone

Cryptopone rotundiceps (Emery, 1914)

Diacamma
References:
Diacamma australe (Fabricius, 1775) – Australian bladder ant
Diacamma colosseense Forel, 1915
Diacamma leve Crawley, 1915
Diacamma schoedli Shattuck & Barnett, 2006

Dilobocondyla
Dilobocondyla cataulacoidea (Stitz, 1911)

Discothyrea
References:
Discothyrea bidens Clark, 1928
Discothyrea crassicornis Clark, 1926
Discothyrea leae Clark, 1934
Discothyrea turtoni Clark, 1934
Discothyrea velutina (Wheeler, 1916)

Doleromyrma
References:
Doleromyrma darwiniana (Forel, 1907) – Brown house ant
Doleromyrma rottnestensis Wheeler, 1934

Dolichoderus

References:

Dolichoderus albamaculus Shattuck & Marsden, 2013
Dolichoderus angusticornis Clark, 1930
Dolichoderus australis André, 1896 – Soft dolly ant
Dolichoderus canopus Shattuck & Marsden, 2013
Dolichoderus clarki Wheeler, 1935
Dolichoderus clusor Forel, 1907
Dolichoderus dentatus Forel, 1902
Dolichoderus doriae Emery, 1887 – Double spined dolly ant
Dolichoderus etus Shattuck & Marsden, 2013
Dolichoderus extensispinus Forel, 1915
Dolichoderus formosus Clark, 1930
Dolichoderus gordoni Shattuck & Marsden, 2013
Dolichoderus goudiei Clark, 1930
Dolichoderus inferus Shattuck & Marsden, 2013
Dolichoderus kathae Shattuck & Marsden, 2013
Dolichoderus niger Crawley, 1922
Dolichoderus nigricornis Clark, 1930
Dolichoderus omicron Shattuck & Marsden, 2013
Dolichoderus parvus Clark, 1930
Dolichoderus reflexus Clark, 1930 – Sharkfined dolly ant
Dolichoderus rufotibialis Clark, 1930
Dolichoderus rutilus Shattuck & Marsden, 2013
Dolichoderus scabridus Roger, 1862
Dolichoderus scrobiculatus (Mayr, 1876) – Northern sharkfined dolly ant
Dolichoderus semiorbis Shattuck & Marsden, 2013
Dolichoderus turneri Forel, 1902
Dolichoderus ypsilon Forel, 1902

Echinopla
References:
Echinopla australis Forel, 1901
Echinopla turneri Forel, 1901

Ectomomyrmex
Ectomomyrmex astutus Smith, 1858
Ectomomyrmex ruficornis (Clark, 1934)

Epopostruma
References:

Epopostruma angela Shattuck, 2000
Epopostruma angulata Shattuck, 2000
Epopostruma areosylva Shattuck, 2000
Epopostruma avicula Shattuck, 2000
Epopostruma curiosa Shattuck, 2000
Epopostruma frosti (Brown, 1948)
Epopostruma infuscocephala Shattuck, 2000
Epopostruma inornata Shattuck, 2007
Epopostruma kangarooensis Shattuck, 2000
Epopostruma lattini Shattuck, 2000
Epopostruma mercurii Shattuck, 2000
Epopostruma monstrosa Viehmeyer, 1925
Epopostruma natalae Shattuck, 2000
Epopostruma quadrispinosa (Forel, 1895)
Epopostruma sowestensis Shattuck, 2000
Epopostruma terrula Shattuck, 2000
Epopostruma vitta Shattuck, 2000
Epopostruma wardi Shattuck, 2000

Eurhopalothrix
Eurhopalothrix australis Brown & Kempf, 1960
Eurhopalothrix emeryi (Forel, 1912)
Eurhopalothrix procera (Emery, 1897)

Froggattella
Froggattella kirbii (Lowne, 1865) – Common froglet ant
Froggattella latispina Wheeler, 1936

Gnamptogenys
Gnamptogenys biroi (Emery, 1902)

Heteroponera

Heteroponera crozieri Taylor, 2011
Heteroponera darlingtonorum Taylor, 2015
Heteroponera ecarinata Taylor, 2015
Heteroponera imbellis (Emery, 1895)
Heteroponera leae (Wheeler, 1923)
Heteroponera lioprocta Taylor, 2015
Heteroponera majeri Taylor, 2011
Heteroponera monteithi Taylor, 2015
Heteroponera pendergrasti Taylor, 2015
Heteroponera relicta (Wheeler, 1915)
Heteroponera rhodopygea Taylor, 2015
Heteroponera trachypyx Taylor, 2015
Heteroponera viviennae Taylor, 2015
Heteroponera wilsoni Taylor, 2015

Hypoponera
References:

Hypoponera congrua (Wheeler, 1934)
Hypoponera convexiuscula (Forel, 1900)
Hypoponera decora (Clark, 1934)
Hypoponera elliptica (Forel, 1900)
Hypoponera herbertonensis (Forel, 1915)
Hypoponera mackayensis (Forel, 1900)
Hypoponera punctatissima (Roger, 1859)
Hypoponera queenslandensis (Forel, 1900)
Hypoponera rectidens (Clark, 1934)
Hypoponera scitula (Clark, 1934)
Hypoponera sulciceps (Clark, 1928)

Iridomyrmex
References:

Iridomyrmex adstringatus Heterick & Shattuck, 2011
Iridomyrmex agilis Forel, 1907 – Agile tyrant ant
Iridomyrmex alpinus Heterick & Shattuck, 2011
Iridomyrmex anceps (Roger, 1863) – Tropical tyrant ant
Iridomyrmex anderseni Shattuck, 1993
Iridomyrmex angusticeps Forel, 1901
Iridomyrmex anteroinclinus Shattuck, 1993
Iridomyrmex atypicus Heterick & Shattuck, 2011
Iridomyrmex azureus Viehmeyer, 1914
Iridomyrmex bicknelli Emery, 1898 – Dome headed tyrant ant
Iridomyrmex bigi Shattuck, 1993
Iridomyrmex brennani Heterick & Shattuck, 2011
Iridomyrmex brunneus Forel, 1902
Iridomyrmex calvus Emery, 1914
Iridomyrmex cappoinclinus Shattuck, 1993
Iridomyrmex cephaloinclinus Shattuck, 1993
Iridomyrmex chasei Forel, 1902
Iridomyrmex coeruleus Heterick & Shattuck, 2011
Iridomyrmex conifer Forel, 1902 – Coned tyrant ant
Iridomyrmex continentis Forel, 1907
Iridomyrmex cuneiceps Heterick & Shattuck, 2011
Iridomyrmex cupreus Heterick & Shattuck, 2011
Iridomyrmex curvifrons Heterick & Shattuck, 2011
Iridomyrmex cyaneus Wheeler, 1915 – Blue tyrant ant
Iridomyrmex difficilis Heterick & Shattuck, 2011
Iridomyrmex discors Forel, 1902
Iridomyrmex dromus Clark, 1938
Iridomyrmex elongatus Heterick & Shattuck, 2011
Iridomyrmex exsanguis Forel, 1907
Iridomyrmex fulgens Heterick & Shattuck, 2011
Iridomyrmex galbanus Shattuck, 1993
Iridomyrmex gibbus Heterick & Shattuck, 2011
Iridomyrmex gumnos Heterick & Shattuck, 2011
Iridomyrmex hartmeyeri Forel, 1907
Iridomyrmex hertogi Heterick & Shattuck, 2011
Iridomyrmex hesperus Shattuck, 1993
Iridomyrmex infuscus Heterick & Shattuck, 2011
Iridomyrmex innocens Forel, 1907
Iridomyrmex lividus Shattuck, 1993 – Blue meat ant
Iridomyrmex longisoma Heterick & Shattuck, 2011
Iridomyrmex luteoclypeatus Heterick & Shattuck, 2011
Iridomyrmex macrops Heterick & Shattuck, 2011
Iridomyrmex mattiroloi Emery, 1898 – Little tyrant ant
Iridomyrmex mayri Forel, 1915 – Titan pony ant
Iridomyrmex meridianus Heterick & Shattuck, 2011
Iridomyrmex minor Forel, 1915
Iridomyrmex mirabilis Heterick & Shattuck, 2011
Iridomyrmex mjobergi Forel, 1915
Iridomyrmex neocaledonica Heterick & Shattuck, 2011
Iridomyrmex niger Heterick & Shattuck, 2011
Iridomyrmex nudipes Heterick & Shattuck, 2011
Iridomyrmex obscurior Forel, 1902
Iridomyrmex obsidianus Emery, 1914
Iridomyrmex omalonotus Heterick & Shattuck, 2011
Iridomyrmex pallidus Forel, 1901
Iridomyrmex phillipensis Heterick & Shattuck, 2011
Iridomyrmex prismatis Shattuck, 1993
Iridomyrmex purpureus (Smith, 1858) – Meat ant 
Iridomyrmex reburrus Shattuck, 1993 – Bearded meat ant
Iridomyrmex roseatus Heterick & Shattuck, 2011
Iridomyrmex rubriceps Forel, 1902
Iridomyrmex rufoinclinus Shattuck, 1993 – Northern bearded tyrant ant
Iridomyrmex rufoniger (Lowne, 1865) – Tufted tyrant ant
Iridomyrmex sanguineus Forel, 1910 – Northern meat ant
Iridomyrmex setoconus Shattuck & McMillan, 1998
Iridomyrmex spadius Shattuck, 1993
Iridomyrmex splendens Forel, 1907
Iridomyrmex spodipilus Shattuck, 1993
Iridomyrmex spurcus Wheeler, 1915
Iridomyrmex suchieri Forel, 1907
Iridomyrmex suchieroides Heterick & Shattuck, 2011
Iridomyrmex tenebrans Heterick & Shattuck, 2011
Iridomyrmex tenuiceps Heterick & Shattuck, 2011
Iridomyrmex trigonoceps Heterick & Shattuck, 2011
Iridomyrmex turbineus Shattuck & McMillan, 1998
Iridomyrmex victorianus Forel, 1902
Iridomyrmex viridiaeneus Viehmeyer, 1914 – Centralian meat ant
Iridomyrmex viridigaster Clark, 1941 – Southern bearded tyrant ant
Iridomyrmex xanthocoxa Heterick & Shattuck, 2011

Iroponera
References:
Iroponera odax Schmidt & Shattuck, 2014

Leptanilla
Leptanilla swani Wheeler, 1932

Leptogenys
References:

Leptogenys adlerzi Forel, 1900
Leptogenys angustinoda Clark, 1934
Leptogenys anitae Forel, 1915
Leptogenys bidentata Forel, 1900
Leptogenys centralis Wheeler, 1915
Leptogenys chelifera (Santschi, 1928)
Leptogenys clarki Wheeler, 1933
Leptogenys conigera (Mayr, 1876)
Leptogenys darlingtoni Wheeler, 1933
Leptogenys diminuta (Smith, 1857)
Leptogenys ebenina Forel, 1915
Leptogenys excisa (Mayr, 1876)
Leptogenys exigua Crawley, 1921 – Genial killer ant
Leptogenys fallax (Mayr, 1876)
Leptogenys fortior Forel, 1900
Leptogenys hackeri Clark, 1934
Leptogenys intricata Viehmeyer, 1924
Leptogenys longensis Forel, 1915
Leptogenys magna Forel, 1900
Leptogenys mjobergi Forel, 1915
Leptogenys neutralis Forel, 1907
Leptogenys podenzanai Emery, 1895
Leptogenys sjostedti Forel, 1915
Leptogenys tricosa Taylor, 1969
Leptogenys turneri Forel, 1900

Leptomyrmex
References:

Leptomyrmex aitchisoni Smith and Shattuck, 2009
Leptomyrmex burwelli Smith and Shattuck, 2009
Leptomyrmex cnemidatus Wheeler, 1915
Leptomyrmex darlingtoni Wheeler, 1934
Leptomyrmex dolichoscapus Smith and Shattuck, 2009
Leptomyrmex erythrocephalus (Fabricius, 1775) – Red-headed spider ant
Leptomyrmex garretti Smith and Shattuck, 2009
Leptomyrmex mjobergi Forel, 1915
Leptomyrmex nigriventris (Guérin-Méneville, 1831)
Leptomyrmex pilosus Smith and Shattuck, 2009
Leptomyrmex ramorniensis Smith and Shattuck, 2009
Leptomyrmex rothneyi Forel, 1902
Leptomyrmex ruficeps Emery, 1895
Leptomyrmex rufipes Emery, 1895
Leptomyrmex rufithorax Forel, 1915
Leptomyrmex tibialis Emery, 1895
Leptomyrmex unicolor Emery, 1895
Leptomyrmex varians Emery, 1895
Leptomyrmex wiburdi Wheeler, 1915

Linepithema

Linepithema humile (Mayr, 1868) – introduced species – Argentine ant

Lioponera
References:

Lioponera aberrans (Clark, 1934)
Lioponera adama Forel, 1910
Lioponera angustata (Clark, 1924)
Lioponera bicolor (Clark, 1924)
Lioponera binodis Forel, 1910
Lioponera brevicollis (Clark, 1923)
Lioponera brevis (Clark, 1924) – Little cannibal ant
Lioponera clarki (Crawley, 1922) – Speckled cannibal ant
Lioponera clarus (Clark, 1930)
Lioponera constricta (Clark, 1923)
Lioponera crassa (Clark, 1941)
Lioponera elegans (Wheeler, 1918)
Lioponera emeryi Bolton, 1995
Lioponera fervida (Wheeler, 1918) – Two lined cannibal ant
Lioponera ficosa (Wheeler, 1918)
Lioponera flammea (Clark, 1930)
Lioponera gilesi (Clark, 1923)
Lioponera grandis (Clark, 1934)
Lioponera greavesi (Clark, 1934)
Lioponera gwynethae (Clark, 1941)
Lioponera heros (Wheeler, 1918)
Lioponera inconspicua Brown, 1975
Lioponera jovis Forel, 1915
Lioponera larvata (Wheeler, 1918)
Lioponera longitarsus (Mayr, 1878)  – Topless cannibal ants
Lioponera macrops (Clark, 1941)
Lioponera mjobergi Forel, 1915
Lioponera mullewana (Wheeler, 1918)
Lioponera nigriventris (Clark, 1924)
Lioponera picipes (Clark, 1924)
Lioponera picta (Clark, 1934)
Lioponera piliventris (Clark, 1941)
Lioponera potteri (Clark, 1941)
Lioponera punctatissima (Clark, 1923)
Lioponera reticulata Brown, 1975
Lioponera ruficornis (Clark, 1923)
Lioponera rugulinodis (Wheeler, 1918)
Lioponera senescens (Wheeler, 1918)
Lioponera simmonsae (Clark, 1923)
Lioponera singularis Forel, 1900  – Carinate cannibal ant
Lioponera sjostedti Forel, 1915
Lioponera turneri Forel, 1902
Lioponera varians (Clark, 1924)

Lordomyrma
Lordomyrma leae Wheeler, 1919
Lordomyrma punctiventris Wheeler, 1919

Mayriella
References:
Mayriella abstinens Forel, 1902
Mayriella ebbei Shattuck & Barnett, 2007
Mayriella occidua Shattuck, 2007
Mayriella overbecki Viehmeyer, 1925
Mayriella spinosior Wheeler, 1935

Melophorus
References:

Melophorus aeneovirens (Lowne, 1865) – Giant beaked furnace ant
Melophorus anderseni Agosti, 1997 – Northern robber furnace ant
Melophorus bagoti Lubbock, 1883 – Bagot's furnace ant
Melophorus biroi Forel, 1907
Melophorus bruneus McAreavey, 1949 – Brown furnace ants
Melophorus constans Santschi, 1928
Melophorus curtus Forel, 1902
Melophorus fieldi Forel, 1910 – Common furnace ant
Melophorus fulvihirtus Clark, 1941 – Southern robber furnace ant
Melophorus hirsutus Forel, 1902 – Barrel furnace ant
Melophorus insularis Wheeler, 1934
Melophorus iridescens (Emery, 1887) – Racing furnace ant
Melophorus laticeps Wheeler, 1915
Melophorus ludius Forel, 1902
Melophorus majeri Agosti, 1997
Melophorus marius Forel, 1910
Melophorus mjobergi Forel, 1915 – Pygmy furnace ant
Melophorus omniparens Forel, 1915
Melophorus pillipes Santschi, 1919  – Bottlebrush furnace ant
Melophorus potteri McAreavey, 1947 – Bulldozer furnace ant
Melophorus scipio Forel, 1915
Melophorus turneri Forel, 1910
Melophorus wheeleri Forel, 1910 – Harvester furnace ant

Meranoplus

Meranoplus ajax Forel, 1915
Meranoplus angustinodis Schödl, 2007
Meranoplus arcuatus Schödl, 2007
Meranoplus aureolus Crawley, 1921
Meranoplus barretti Santschi, 1928
Meranoplus beatoni  Taylor, 2006
Meranoplus berrimah Schödl, 2007
Meranoplus christinae Schödl, 2007
Meranoplus convexius Schödl, 2007
Meranoplus crassispina Schödl, 2007
Meranoplus curvispina Forel, 1910
Meranoplus deserticola Schödl, 2007
Meranoplus dichrous Forel, 1907
Meranoplus digitatus Schödl, 2007
Meranoplus dimidiatus Smith, 1867 – Box shield ants
Meranoplus discalis Schödl, 2007
Meranoplus diversoides Schödl, 2007
Meranoplus diversus Smith, 1867 – Harvester shield ant
Meranoplus doddi Santschi, 1928
Meranoplus duyfkeni Forel, 1915
Meranoplus excavatus Clark, 1938
Meranoplus fenestratus Smith, 1867 –  Holy shield ant
Meranoplus ferrugineus Crawley, 1922
Meranoplus froggatti Forel, 1913 – False tirtle ant
Meranoplus hilli Crawley, 1922
Meranoplus hirsutus Mayr, 1876 – Jungle shield ant
Meranoplus hoplites  Taylor, 2006
Meranoplus hospes Forel, 1910
Meranoplus linae Santschi, 1928
Meranoplus mars Forel, 1902
Meranoplus mcarthuri Schödl, 2007
Meranoplus minimus Crawley, 1922
Meranoplus minor Forel, 1902
Meranoplus mjobergi Forel, 1915 – Chocolate shield ant
Meranoplus naitsabes Schödl, 2007
Meranoplus occidentalis Schödl, 2007
Meranoplus oceanicus Smith, 1862
Meranoplus orientalis Schödl, 2007
Meranoplus oxleyi Forel, 1915
Meranoplus pubescens (Smith, 1853)
Meranoplus puryi Forel, 1902
Meranoplus rugosus Crawley, 1922
Meranoplus schoedli  Taylor, 2006
Meranoplus similis Viehmeyer, 1922
Meranoplus snellingi Schödl, 2007
Meranoplus taurus Schödl, 2007
Meranoplus testudineus McAreavey, 1956 – Turtle ant
Meranoplus tricuspidatus Schödl, 2007
Meranoplus unicolor Forel, 1902
Meranoplus variabilis Schödl, 2007
Meranoplus wilsoni Schödl, 2007

Mesoponera
References:
Mesoponera australis (Forel, 1900)
Mesoponera rubra (Smith, F. 1857)

Mesostruma
References:

Mesostruma bella Shattuck, 2000
Mesostruma browni Taylor, 1962
Mesostruma eccentrica Taylor, 1973
Mesostruma exolympica Taylor, 1973
Mesostruma inornata Shattuck, 2000
Mesostruma laevigata Brown, 1952
Mesostruma loweryi Taylor, 1973
Mesostruma spinosa Shattuck, 2007
Mesostruma turneri (Forel, 1895)

Metapone
Metapone hoelldobleri Taylor & Alpert, 2016
Metapone leae Wheeler, 1919
Metapone mathinnae Taylor & Alpert, 2016
Metapone mjobergi  Forel, 1915
Metapone tecklini Taylor & Alpert, 2016
Metapone tillyardi Wheeler, 1919
Metapone tricolor McAreavey, 1949

Monomorium

Monomorium aithoderum Heterick, 2001
Monomorium albipes Heterick, 2001
Monomorium anderseni Heterick, 2001
Monomorium anthracinum Heterick, 2001
Monomorium arenarium Heterick, 2001
Monomorium bicorne Forel, 1907
Monomorium bifidum Heterick, 2001 – Northern fanged mono ant
Monomorium bihamatum Heterick, 2001
Monomorium bogischi Wheeler, 1917
Monomorium brachythrix Heterick, 2001
Monomorium broschorum Sparks, 2015
Monomorium burchera Heterick, 2001
Monomorium capito Heterick, 2001
Monomorium capeyork Sparks, 2015
Monomorium carinatum Heterick, 2001 – Angled mono ant
Monomorium castaneum Heterick, 2001
Monomorium centrale Forel, 1910
Monomorium crinitum Heterick, 2001
Monomorium decuria Heterick, 2001
Monomorium disetigerum Heterick, 2001
Monomorium draculai Heterick, 2001
Monomorium durokoppinense Heterick, 2001
Monomorium elegantulum Heterick, 2001
Monomorium eremoides Sparks, 2015
Monomorium eremophilum Heterick, 2001
Monomorium eremum Sparks, 2015
Monomorium euryodon Heterick, 2001
Monomorium falcatum (McAreavey, 1949)
Monomorium fieldi Forel, 1910 – Little black mono ant
Monomorium flavonigrum Heterick, 2001
Monomorium floricola (Jerdon, 1851) – Brownish-red flower ant
Monomorium geminum Sparks, 2015
Monomorium gilberti Forel, 1902
Monomorium hertogi Sparks, 2015
Monomorium hoffmanni Sparks, 2015
Monomorium humilior Forel, 1910
Monomorium insolescens Wheeler, 1934 – Monsoonal mono ant
Monomorium intrudens Smith, 1874
Monomorium kidman Sparks, 2015
Monomorium kiliani Forel, 1902
Monomorium lacunosum Heterick, 2001
Monomorium laeve Mayr, 1876 – Yellow mono ant
Monomorium leae Forel, 1913
Monomorium leda Forel, 1915
Monomorium legulum Heterick, 2001
Monomorium longiceps Wheeler, 1934 – Mallee mono ant
Monomorium longinode Heterick, 2001
Monomorium macarthuri Heterick, 2001
Monomorium majeri Heterick, 2001
Monomorium maryannae Sparks, 2015
Monomorium megalops Heterick, 2001
Monomorium merepah Sparks, 2015
Monomorium micula Heterick, 2001
Monomorium mitchell Sparks, 2015
Monomorium nanum Heterick, 2001
Monomorium nightcapense Heterick, 2001
Monomorium nigriceps Heterick, 2001 – Little black mono ant
Monomorium occidaneum Crawley, 1922
Monomorium oodnadatta Sparks, 2015
Monomorium parantarcticum Heterick, 2001
Monomorium petiolatum Heterick, 2001
Monomorium pharaonis (Linnaeus, 1758) – Pharaoh ant
Monomorium pilbara Sparks, 2015
Monomorium pubescens Heterick, 2001
Monomorium punctulatum Heterick, 2003
Monomorium ravenshoense Heterick, 2001
Monomorium rothsteini Forel, 1902 – Smiling mono ant
Monomorium rubriceps Mayr, 1876
Monomorium rufonigrum Heterick, 2001
Monomorium sculpturatum Clark, 1934
Monomorium shattucki Heterick, 2001
Monomorium silaceum Heterick, 2001
Monomorium sordidum Forel, 1902
Monomorium speculum Sparks, 2015
Monomorium stagnum Sparks, 2015
Monomorium stictonotum Heterick, 2001
Monomorium striatifrons Heterick, 2001
Monomorium subapterum Wheeler, 1917
Monomorium sublamellatum Heterick, 2003
Monomorium sydneyense Forel, 1902 – Sydney mono ant
Monomorium tambourinense Forel, 1915 – Tambourine Mountain mono ant
Monomorium tenebrosum Sparks, 2015
Monomorium topend Sparks, 2015
Monomorium torrens Sparks, 2015
Monomorium whitei Wheeler, 1915 – Southern fanged mono ant
Monomorium xantheklemma Heterick, 2001

Myopias
Myopias chapmani Willey & Brown, 1983
Myopias delta Willey & Brown, 1983
Myopias densesticta Willey & Brown, 1983
Myopias tasmaniensis Wheeler, 1923
Myopias tenuis (Emery, 1900)

Myopopone
Myopopone castanea (Smith, 1860)

Myrmecia

Myrmecia aberrans Forel, 1900 – Wide jawed bullant
Myrmecia acuta Ogata & Taylor, 1991
Myrmecia analis Mayr, 1862
Myrmecia arnoldi Clark, 1951
Myrmecia athertonensis Forel, 1915
Myrmecia auriventris Mayr, 1870
Myrmecia banksi Taylor, 2015
Myrmecia borealis Ogata & Taylor, 1991
Myrmecia brevinoda Forel, 1910 – Giant bull ant
Myrmecia browningi Ogata & Taylor, 1991
Myrmecia callima (Clark, 1943)
Myrmecia cephalotes (Clark, 1943)
Myrmecia chasei Forel, 1894
Myrmecia chrysogaster (Clark, 1943) – Toothed bullant
Myrmecia clarki Crawley, 1922
Myrmecia comata Clark, 1951
Myrmecia croslandi Taylor, 1991
Myrmecia cydista (Clark, 1943)
Myrmecia desertorum Wheeler, 1915
Myrmecia dichospila Clark, 1938
Myrmecia dimidiata Clark, 1951
Myrmecia dispar (Clark, 1951)
Myrmecia elegans (Clark, 1943)
Myrmecia erecta Ogata & Taylor, 1991
Myrmecia esuriens Fabricius, 1804 – Tasmanian Inchman
Myrmecia eungellensis Ogata & Taylor, 1991
Myrmecia exigua (Clark, 1943)
Myrmecia fabricii Ogata & Taylor, 1991
Myrmecia ferruginea Mayr, 1876
Myrmecia flammicollis Brown, 1953
Myrmecia flavicoma Roger, 1861
Myrmecia forceps Roger, 1861
Myrmecia forficata (Fabricius, 1787) – Inchmen ant
Myrmecia formosa Wheeler, 1933
Myrmecia froggatti Forel, 1910
Myrmecia fucosa Clark, 1934
Myrmecia fulgida Clark, 1951
Myrmecia fulviculis Forel, 1913
Myrmecia fulvipes Roger, 1861
Myrmecia fuscipes Clark, 1951
Myrmecia gilberti Forel, 1910
Myrmecia gratiosa Clark, 1951
Myrmecia gulosa (Fabricius, 1775) – Giant red bull ant
Myrmecia harderi Forel, 1910
Myrmecia haskinsorum Taylor, 2015
Myrmecia hilli (Clark, 1943)
Myrmecia hirsuta Clark, 1951
Myrmecia imaii Taylor, 2015
Myrmecia impaternata Taylor, 2015
Myrmecia infima Forel, 1900
Myrmecia inquilina Douglas & Brown, 1959
Myrmecia loweryi Ogata & Taylor, 1991
Myrmecia ludlowi Crawley, 1922
Myrmecia luteiforceps Wheeler, 1933
Myrmecia mandibularis Smith, 1858 – Toothless bullant
Myrmecia maura Wheeler, 1933
Myrmecia michaelseni Forel, 1907
Myrmecia midas Clark, 1951
Myrmecia minuscula Forel, 1915
Myrmecia mjobergi Forel, 1915
Myrmecia nigra Forel, 1907
Myrmecia nigriceps Mayr, 1862 – Black-headed bull ant
Myrmecia nigriscapa Roger, 1861
Myrmecia nigrocincta Smith, 1858
Myrmecia nobilis (Clark, 1943)
Myrmecia occidentalis (Clark, 1943)
Myrmecia pavida Clark, 1951
Myrmecia petiolata Emery, 1895
Myrmecia picta Smith, 1858
Myrmecia picticeps Clark, 1951
Myrmecia piliventris Smith, 1858 – Golden-tailed bull ant
Myrmecia pilosula Smith, 1858 – Jack jumper ant
Myrmecia potteri (Clark, 1951)
Myrmecia pulchra Clark, 1929
Myrmecia pyriformis Smith, 1858 – Inch ant
Myrmecia queenslandica Forel, 1915
Myrmecia regularis Crawley, 1925
Myrmecia rowlandi Forel, 1910
Myrmecia rubicunda (Clark, 1943)
Myrmecia rubripes Clark, 1951
Myrmecia rufinodis Smith, 1858
Myrmecia rugosa Wheeler, 1933
Myrmecia simillima Smith, 1858
Myrmecia subfasciata Viehmeyer, 1924
Myrmecia swalei Crawley, 1922
Myrmecia tarsata Smith, 1858
Myrmecia tepperi Emery, 1898 – Bucktoothed bullant
Myrmecia testaceipes (Clark, 1943)
Myrmecia tridentata Ogata & Taylor, 1991
Myrmecia urens Lowne, 1865 – Baby bull ant
Myrmecia varians Mayr, 1876
Myrmecia vindex Smith, 1858

Myrmecina

Myrmecina alpina Shattuck, 2009
Myrmecina australis Wheeler and Wheeler, 1973
Myrmecina difficulta Shattuck, 2009
Myrmecina eruga Shattuck, 2009
Myrmecina inaequala Shattuck, 2009
Myrmecina pumila Shattuck, 2009
Myrmecina rugosa Forel, 1902
Myrmecina silvalaeva Shattuck, 2009
Myrmecina silvampla Shattuck, 2009
Myrmecina silvangula Shattuck, 2009
Myrmecina silvarugosa Shattuck, 2009
Myrmecina silvatransversa Shattuck, 2009
Myrmecina wesselensis Shattuck, 2009

Myrmecorhynchus
Myrmecorhynchus carteri  Clark, 1934
Myrmecorhynchus emeryi  André, 1896
Myrmecorhynchus musgravei  Clark, 1934
Myrmecorhynchus nitidus  Clark, 1934
Myrmecorhynchus rufithorax  Clark, 1934

Mystrium
Mystrium camillae Emery, 1889

Nebothriomyrmex
Nebothriomyrmex majeri Dubovikoff, 2004

Nothomyrmecia

Nothomyrmecia macrops Clark, 1951 – Dinosaur ant

Notoncus
References:
Notoncus capitatus Forel, 1915
Notoncus ectatommoides (Forel, 1892) – Pronged epaulet ant
Notoncus enormis Szabó, 1910 – Bulbous epaulet ants
Notoncus gilberti Forel, 1895 – Smooth epaulet ant
Notoncus hickmani Clark, 1930 – Yellow epaulet ant
Notoncus spinisquamis (André, 1896) – Giant epaulet ant

Notostigma
Notostigma carazzii (Emery, 1895)
Notostigma foreli Emery, 1920

Nylanderia
Nylanderia bourbonica (Forel, 1886)
Nylanderia braueri (Mayr, 1868)
Nylanderia glabrior (Forel, 1902)
Nylanderia obscura (Mayr, 1862) – Swamp parrot ant
Nylanderia rosae (Forel, 1902)
Nylanderia tasmaniensis (Forel, 1913)
Nylanderia vaga (Forel, 1901) – Forest parrot ant

Ochetellus
References:
Ochetellus democles (Walker, 1839)
Ochetellus flavipes (Kirby, 1896) – Spinifex ant
Ochetellus glaber (Mayr, 1862) – Black house ant
Ochetellus punctatissimus (Emery, 1887)

Odontomachus
References:
Odontomachus cephalotes Smith, 1863
Odontomachus ruficeps Smith, 1858
Odontomachus simillimus Smith, 1858
Odontomachus turneri Forel, 1900 – Garden snappy ant

Oecophylla

Oecophylla smaragdina (Fabricius, 1775) – Green tree ant

Onychomyrmex
Onychomyrmex doddi Wheeler, 1916
Onychomyrmex hedleyi Emery, 1895
Onychomyrmex mjobergi Forel, 1915

Ooceraea
Ooceraea australis (Forel, 1900) – Blind cannibal ant

Opisthopsis

Opisthopsis diadematus Wheeler, 1918 – Black capped strobe ant
Opisthopsis haddoni Emery, 1893 – Red-headed strobe ant
Opisthopsis jocosus Wheeler, 1918
Opisthopsis lienosus Wheeler, 1918
Opisthopsis major Forel, 1902 – Tufted strobe ant
Opisthopsis maurus Wheeler, 1918
Opisthopsis pictus Emery, 1895 – Painted strobe ant
Opisthopsis respiciens (Smith, 1865)
Opisthopsis rufithorax Emery, 1895 – Black-headed strobe ant

Orectognathus

Orectognathus alligator Taylor, 1980
Orectognathus antennatus Smith, 1854
Orectognathus clarki Brown, 1953
Orectognathus coccinatus Taylor, 1980
Orectognathus darlingtoni Taylor, 1977
Orectognathus elegantulus Taylor, 1977
Orectognathus howensis Wheeler, 1927 – Lord Howe Island goblin ant
Orectognathus kanangra Taylor, 1980
Orectognathus mjobergi Forel, 1915
Orectognathus nanus Taylor, 1977
Orectognathus nigriventris Mercovich, 1958
Orectognathus parvispinus Taylor, 1977
Orectognathus phyllobates Brown, 1958
Orectognathus robustus Taylor, 1977
Orectognathus rostratus Lowery, 1967
Orectognathus satan Brown, 1953
Orectognathus sexspinosus Forel, 1915
Orectognathus versicolor Donisthorpe, 1940

Papyrius
References:
Papyrius flavus (Mayr, 1865)
Papyrius nitidus (Mayr, 1862) – Red cocktail ant

Paraparatrechina
Paraparatrechina minutula (Forel, 1901)
Paraparatrechina nana (Santschi, 1928)

Paratrechina
Paratrechina longicornis (Latreille, 1802) – introduced species – Hairy ant

Parvaponera
Parvaponera darwinii (Forel, 1893)

Peronomyrmex
Peronomyrmex bartoni Shattuck & Hinkley, 2002
Peronomyrmex greavesi Shattuck, 2006
Peronomyrmex overbecki Viehmeyer, 1922

Pheidole
References:

Pheidole ampla Forel, 1893 – Seedharvesting ant
Pheidole anthracina Forel, 1902 – Seedharvesting ant
Pheidole antipodum (Smith, 1858)
Pheidole athertonensis Forel, 1915
Pheidole bos Forel, 1893
Pheidole brevicornis Mayr, 1876
Pheidole cairnsiana Forel, 1902
Pheidole concentrica Forel, 1902
Pheidole conficta Forel, 1902
Pheidole deserticola Forel, 1910
Pheidole dispar (Forel, 1895)
Pheidole gellibrandi Clark, 1934
Pheidole hartmeyeri Forel, 1907 – Harvester bigheaded ant
Pheidole impressiceps Mayr, 1876  – Giant big-headed ant
Pheidole incurvata Viehmeyer, 1924
Pheidole liteae Forel, 1910
Pheidole longiceps Mayr, 1876 – Knobbed bigheaded ant 
Pheidole megacephala (Fabricius, 1793) – Coastal brown ant
Pheidole mjobergi Forel, 1915 – Savanna bigheaded ant
Pheidole oceanica Mayr, 1866
Pheidole opaciventris Mayr, 1876
Pheidole platypus Crawley, 1915
Pheidole proxima Mayr, 1876
Pheidole pyriformis Clark, 1938
Pheidole spinoda (Smith, 1858)
Pheidole tasmaniensis Mayr, 1866
Pheidole trapezoidea Viehmeyer, 1913
Pheidole turneri Forel, 1902
Pheidole variabilis Mayr, 1876
Pheidole vigilans (Smith, 1858)
Pheidole wiesei Forel, 1910

Philidris
References:
Philidris cordata (Smith, 1859)

Plagiolepis
References:
Plagiolepis clarki Wheeler, 1934
Plagiolepis lucidula Wheeler, 1934
Plagiolepis nynganensis McAreavey, 1949
Plagiolepis squamulosa Wheeler, 1934
Plagiolepis wilsoni (Clark, 1934)

Platythyrea
Platythyrea brunnipes (Clark, 1938)
Platythyrea dentinodis (Clark, 1930)
Platythyrea micans (Clark, 1930)
Platythyrea parallela Smith, 1859 – Northern broadnosed killer ant
Platythyrea turneri Forel, 1895 – Southern broadnosed killer ant

Podomyrma
References:

Podomyrma abdominalis Emery, 1887
Podomyrma adelaidae (Smith, 1858) – Desert muscleman ant
Podomyrma basalis Smith, 1859
Podomyrma bispinosa Forel, 1901
Podomyrma chasei Forel, 1901
Podomyrma christae (Forel, 1907)
Podomyrma clarki (Crawley, 1925)
Podomyrma delbrueckii Forel, 1901
Podomyrma densestrigosa Viehmeyer, 1924
Podomyrma elongata Forel, 1895
Podomyrma femorata Smith, 1859
Podomyrma ferruginea (Clark, 1934)
Podomyrma formosa (Smith, 1858)
Podomyrma gastralis Emery, 1897
Podomyrma gratiosa (Smith, 1858)
Podomyrma grossestriata Forel, 1915
Podomyrma inermis Mayr, 1876
Podomyrma kitschneri (Forel, 1915)
Podomyrma kraepelini Forel, 1901
Podomyrma laevifrons Smith, 1859
Podomyrma laevissima Smith, 1863
Podomyrma lampros Viehmeyer, 1924
Podomyrma libra (Forel, 1907)
Podomyrma macrophthalma Viehmeyer, 1925
Podomyrma maculiventris Emery, 1887
Podomyrma marginata (McAreavey, 1949)
Podomyrma micans Mayr, 1876
Podomyrma mjobergi (Forel, 1915)
Podomyrma muckeli Forel, 1910
Podomyrma nitida (Clark, 1938)
Podomyrma novemdentata Forel, 1901
Podomyrma obscurior Forel, 1915
Podomyrma octodentata Forel, 1901
Podomyrma odae Forel, 1910
Podomyrma omniparens (Forel, 1895)
Podomyrma overbecki Viehmeyer, 1924
Podomyrma rugosa (Clark, 1934)
Podomyrma silvicola Smith, 1860
Podomyrma turneri (Forel, 1901)

Polyrhachis

Polyrhachis abbreviata Kohout, 2006
Polyrhachis alphea Smith, 1863
Polyrhachis ammon (Fabricius, 1775)
Polyrhachis ammonoeides Roger, 1863
Polyrhachis anderseni Kohout, 2013
Polyrhachis andromache Roger, 1863
Polyrhachis angusta Forel, 1902
Polyrhachis appendiculata Emery, 1893
Polyrhachis archeri Kohout, 2013
Polyrhachis arcuata (Le Guillou, 1841)
Polyrhachis argenteosignata Emery, 1900
Polyrhachis argentosa Forel, 1902
Polyrhachis atropos Smith, 1860
Polyrhachis aurea Mayr, 1876
Polyrhachis aurora Kohout, 2013
Polyrhachis australis Mayr, 1870
Polyrhachis bamaga Kohout, 1990
Polyrhachis barretti Clark, 1928
Polyrhachis bedoti Forel, 1902
Polyrhachis bellicosa Smith, 1859
Polyrhachis bicolor Smith, 1858
Polyrhachis bispinosa Kohout, 2013
Polyrhachis bohemia Kohout, 2013
Polyrhachis brevinoda Kohout, 2006
Polyrhachis brisbanensis Kohout, 2013
Polyrhachis brutella Kohout, 2013
Polyrhachis burwelli Kohout, 2013
Polyrhachis callima Kohout, 2013
Polyrhachis capeyorkensis Kohout, 2013
Polyrhachis capillata Kohout, 2013
Polyrhachis captiva Kohout, 2013
Polyrhachis cedarensis Forel, 1915
Polyrhachis clarki Kohout, 2013
Polyrhachis cleopatra Forel, 1902
Polyrhachis clio Forel, 1902
Polyrhachis clotho Forel, 1902
Polyrhachis conciliata Kohout, 2013
Polyrhachis consimilis Smith, 1858
Polyrhachis constricta Emery, 1897
Polyrhachis contemta Mayr, 1876
Polyrhachis cracenta Kohout, 2013
Polyrhachis crawleyi Forel, 1916
Polyrhachis creusa Emery, 1897
Polyrhachis cupreata Emery, 1895
Polyrhachis curtospinosa Kohout, 2013
Polyrhachis cydista  Kohout, 2008
Polyrhachis cyrus Forel, 1901
Polyrhachis daemeli Mayr, 1876 – Daemel's Spiny Ant
Polyrhachis darlingtoni Kohout, 2013
Polyrhachis decumbens Kohout, 2006
Polyrhachis delecta Kohout, 2006
Polyrhachis delicata Crawley, 1915
Polyrhachis denticulata Karavaiev, 1927
Polyrhachis dispar  Kohout, 2010
Polyrhachis diversa Kohout, 2013
Polyrhachis dives Smith, 1857
Polyrhachis dorowi  Kohout, 2009
Polyrhachis dougcooki Kohout, 2013
Polyrhachis electra Kohout, 2013
Polyrhachis elegantula Kohout, 2013
Polyrhachis erato Forel, 1902
Polyrhachis eremita Kohout, 1990
Polyrhachis eureka Kohout, 2013
Polyrhachis euterpe Forel, 1902
Polyrhachis expressa Kohout, 2006
Polyrhachis feehani Kohout, 2013
Polyrhachis femorata Smith, 1858 – Southern broad-nosed spiny ant
Polyrhachis fervens Smith, 1860
Polyrhachis flavibasis Clark, 1930 – Northern broad-nosed spiny ant
Polyrhachis foreli Kohout, 1989
Polyrhachis fuscipes Mayr, 1862
Polyrhachis gab Forel, 1880
Polyrhachis glabrinotum Clark, 1930
Polyrhachis gravis Clark, 1930 – Gravis spiny ant
Polyrhachis guerini Roger, 1863
Polyrhachis heinlethii Forel, 1895
Polyrhachis hermione Emery, 1895
Polyrhachis hespera Kohout, 2013
Polyrhachis hexacantha (Erichson, 1842)
Polyrhachis hirsuta Mayr, 1876  – Hairy spiny ant
Polyrhachis hoelldobleri Kohout, 2006
Polyrhachis hoffmanni Kohout, 2013
Polyrhachis hookeri Lowne, 1865
Polyrhachis incerta  Kohout, 2008
Polyrhachis inconspicua Emery, 1887 – Little spiny ant
Polyrhachis injinooi Kohout, 2013
Polyrhachis insularis Emery, 1887
Polyrhachis inusitata Kohout, 1989
Polyrhachis io Forel, 1915
Polyrhachis isolata Kohout, 2013
Polyrhachis jacksoniana Roger, 1863
Polyrhachis lachesis Forel, 1897
Polyrhachis lata Emery, 1895
Polyrhachis latreillii (Guérin, 1838)
Polyrhachis leae Forel, 1913
Polyrhachis levior Roger, 1863
Polyrhachis loweryi Kohout, 1990
Polyrhachis lownei Forel, 1895
Polyrhachis lydiae Forel, 1902
Polyrhachis machaon Santschi, 1920
Polyrhachis mackayi Donisthorpe, 1938
Polyrhachis macropa Wheeler, 1916 – Mulga spiny ant
Polyrhachis maculata Forel, 1915
Polyrhachis melanura Kohout, 2013
Polyrhachis menozzii Karavaiev, 1927
Polyrhachis micans Mayr, 1876 – Devil spiny ant
Polyrhachis mjobergi Forel, 1915
Polyrhachis monteithi Kohout, 2006
Polyrhachis mucronata Smith, 1859
Polyrhachis nourlangie Kohout, 2013
Polyrhachis obscura Forel, 1895
Polyrhachis obtusa Emery, 1897
Polyrhachis opacita Kohout, 2013
Polyrhachis ops Forel, 1907
Polyrhachis ornata Mayr, 1876 – Golden spiny ant
Polyrhachis pallescens Mayr, 1876
Polyrhachis palmerae Kohout, 2013
Polyrhachis patiens Santschi, 1920 – Toothed spiny ant
Polyrhachis paxilla Smith, 1863
Polyrhachis penelope Forel, 1895
Polyrhachis phryne Forel, 1907
Polyrhachis pilbara Kohout, 2013
Polyrhachis pilosa Donisthorpe, 1938
Polyrhachis placida Kohout, 2013
Polyrhachis polymnia Forel, 1902
Polyrhachis prometheus Santschi, 1920
Polyrhachis pseudothrinax Hung, 1967 – Unicorn spiny ant
Polyrhachis punctiventris Mayr, 1876
Polyrhachis pyrrhus Forel, 1910
Polyrhachis queenslandica Emery, 1895
Polyrhachis reclinata Emery, 1887
Polyrhachis robsoni Kohout, 2006
Polyrhachis rowlandi Forel, 1910
Polyrhachis rufifemur Forel, 1907
Polyrhachis rufofemorata Smith, 1859
Polyrhachis rustica Kohout, 1990
Polyrhachis rutila Kohout, 2006
Polyrhachis schenkii Forel, 1886
Polyrhachis schoopae Forel, 1902
Polyrhachis schwiedlandi Forel, 1902
Polyrhachis seducta Kohout, 2013
Polyrhachis semiaurata Mayr, 1876
Polyrhachis semiobscura Donisthorpe, 1944
Polyrhachis semipolita André, 1896
Polyrhachis senilis Forel, 1902 – Savanna spiny ant
Polyrhachis sexspinosa (Latreille, 1802)
Polyrhachis shattucki Kohout, 2013
Polyrhachis sidnica Mayr, 1866
Polyrhachis smithersi Kohout, 2012
Polyrhachis sokolova Forel, 1902
Polyrhachis stricta Kohout, 2013
Polyrhachis tambourinensis Forel, 1915
Polyrhachis tanami Kohout, 2013
Polyrhachis templi Forel, 1902
Polyrhachis tenebra Kohout, 2013
Polyrhachis terpsichore Forel, 1893
Polyrhachis thais Forel, 1910
Polyrhachis thusnelda Forel, 1902
Polyrhachis trapezoidea Mayr, 1876
Polyrhachis tubifera Forel, 1902
Polyrhachis turneri Forel, 1895
Polyrhachis uncaria Kohout, 2013
Polyrhachis unicornis Kohout, 2013
Polyrhachis vermiculosa Mayr, 1876
Polyrhachis vernoni Kohout, 2013
Polyrhachis weiri Kohout, 2013
Polyrhachis yarrabahensis Forel, 1915
Polyrhachis yorkana Forel, 1915
Polyrhachis zimmerae Clark, 1941

Ponera
Ponera clavicornis Emery, 1900
Ponera incerta Wheeler, 1933
Ponera leae Forel, 1913 – Blind crypt ants
Ponera selenophora Emery, 1900
Ponera tenuis (Emery, 1900)

Prionopelta
Prionopelta robynmae Shattuck, 2008

Pristomyrmex
Pristomyrmex erythropygus Taylor, 1968
Pristomyrmex foveolatus Taylor, 1965
Pristomyrmex minusculus Wang, 2003
Pristomyrmex quadridentatus (André, 1905)
Pristomyrmex thoracicus Taylor, 1965
Pristomyrmex wheeleri Taylor, 1965
Pristomyrmex wilsoni Taylor, 1968

Probolomyrmex
Probolomyrmex aliundus Shattuck, Gunawardene & Heterick, 2012
Probolomyrmex greavesi Taylor, 1965
Probolomyrmex latalongus Shattuck, Gunawardene & Heterick, 2012

Proceratium
Proceratium australe de Andrade, 2003
Proceratium cavinodus de Andrade, 2003
Proceratium gigas de Andrade, 2003
Proceratium gracile de Andrade, 2003
Proceratium hirsutum de Andrade, 2003
Proceratium pumilio de Andrade, 2003
Proceratium robustum de Andrade, 2003
Proceratium stictum Brown, 1958

Prolasius

Prolasius abruptus Clark, 1934
Prolasius antennatus McAreavey, 1947
Prolasius bruneus McAreavey, 1947 – Brown mistral ant
Prolasius clarki McAreavey, 1947
Prolasius convexus McAreavey, 1947
Prolasius depressiceps (Emery, 1914)
Prolasius flavicornis Clark, 1934
Prolasius formicoides (Forel, 1902)
Prolasius hellenae McAreavey, 1947
Prolasius hemiflavus Clark, 1934
Prolasius mjoebergella (Forel, 1916)
Prolasius nitidissimus (André, 1896) – Black mistral ants
Prolasius pallidus Clark, 1934 – Yellow mistral ant
Prolasius quadratus McAreavey, 1947
Prolasius reticulatus McAreavey, 1947
Prolasius robustus McAreavey, 1947
Prolasius wheeleri McAreavey, 1947
Prolasius wilsoni McAreavey, 1947

Pseudolasius
Pseudolasius australis Forel, 1915

Pseudoneoponera
References:

Pseudoneoponera barbata Stitz, 1911
Pseudoneoponera denticulata (Kirby, 1896)
Pseudoneoponera dubitata (Forel, 1900)
Pseudoneoponera excavata (Emery, 1893) – Eared foaming ant
Pseudoneoponera mayri (Emery, 1887)
Pseudoneoponera oculata (Smtih, 1858)
Pseudoneoponera piliventris Smith, 1858
Pseudoneoponera porcata (Emery, 1897) – Striped foaming ant
Pseudoneoponera sublaevis (Emery, 1887) – Smooth foaming ant

Pseudonotoncus
Pseudonotoncus eurysikos Shattuck & O'Reilly, 2013
Pseudonotoncus hirsutus Clark, 1934

Pseudoponera
References:
Pseudoponera pachynoda (Clark, 1930)
Pseudoponera stigma (Fabricius, 1804)

Rhopalomastix
Rhopalomastix rothneyi Forel, 1900

Rhopalothrix
Rhopalothrix orbis Taylor, 1968

Rhytidoponera

Rhytidoponera aciculata (Smith, 1858)
Rhytidoponera anceps Emery, 1898
Rhytidoponera araneoides (Le Guillou, 1841) – Spider pony ant
Rhytidoponera aspera (Roger, 1860) – Rough blue pony ant
Rhytidoponera aurata (Roger, 1861) – Lesser horned pony ant
Rhytidoponera barnardi Clark, 1936
Rhytidoponera barretti Clark, 1941
Rhytidoponera borealis Crawley, 1918
Rhytidoponera carinata Clark, 1936
Rhytidoponera cerastes Crawley, 1925
Rhytidoponera chalybaea Emery, 1901 – Blue pony ant
Rhytidoponera chnoopyx Brown, 1958
Rhytidoponera clarki Donisthorpe, 1943
Rhytidoponera confusa Ward, 1980
Rhytidoponera convexa (Mayr, 1876) – Convex pony ant
Rhytidoponera cornuta (Emery, 1895)
Rhytidoponera crassinoda (Forel, 1907)
Rhytidoponera cristata (Mayr, 1876)
Rhytidoponera croesus Emery, 1901
Rhytidoponera dubia Crawley, 1915
Rhytidoponera enigmatica Ward, 1980
Rhytidoponera eremita Clark, 1936
Rhytidoponera ferruginea Clark, 1936
Rhytidoponera flavicornis Clark, 1936
Rhytidoponera flavipes (Clark, 1941)
Rhytidoponera flindersi Clark, 1936
Rhytidoponera foreli Crawley, 1918
Rhytidoponera foveolata Crawley, 1925
Rhytidoponera fuliginosa Clark, 1936
Rhytidoponera greavesi Clark, 1941
Rhytidoponera gregoryi Clark, 1936
Rhytidoponera haeckeli (Forel, 1910)
Rhytidoponera hilli Crawley, 1915
Rhytidoponera impressa (Mayr, 1876) – Blue pony ant
Rhytidoponera incisa Crawley, 1915
Rhytidoponera inornata Crawley, 1922
Rhytidoponera kurandensis Brown, 1958
Rhytidoponera lamellinodis Santschi, 1919
Rhytidoponera laticeps Forel, 1915
Rhytidoponera levior Crawley, 1925
Rhytidoponera maledicta Forel, 1915
Rhytidoponera maniae (Forel, 1900)
Rhytidoponera mayri (Emery, 1883)
Rhytidoponera metallica (Smith, 1858) – Green-head ant
Rhytidoponera micans Clark, 1936
Rhytidoponera mirabilis Clark, 1936
Rhytidoponera nitida Clark, 1936
Rhytidoponera nodifera (Emery, 1895)
Rhytidoponera nudata (Mayr, 1876)
Rhytidoponera peninsularis Brown, 1958
Rhytidoponera pilosula Clark, 1936
Rhytidoponera punctata (Smith, 1858) – Speckled pony ant
Rhytidoponera punctigera Crawley, 1925
Rhytidoponera punctiventris (Forel, 1900)
Rhytidoponera purpurea (Emery, 1887)
Rhytidoponera reflexa Clark, 1936
Rhytidoponera reticulata (Forel, 1893) – Netted pony ant
Rhytidoponera rufescens (Forel, 1900)
Rhytidoponera rufithorax Clark, 1941
Rhytidoponera rufiventris Forel, 1915
Rhytidoponera rufonigra Clark, 1936
Rhytidoponera scaberrima (Emery, 1895)
Rhytidoponera scabra (Mayr, 1876)
Rhytidoponera scabrior Crawley, 1925
Rhytidoponera socra (Forel, 1894)
Rhytidoponera spoliata (Emery, 1895)
Rhytidoponera tasmaniensis Emery, 1898
Rhytidoponera taurus (Forel, 1910) – Greater horned pony ant
Rhytidoponera tenuis (Forel, 1900) – Delicate pony ant
Rhytidoponera trachypyx Brown, 1958
Rhytidoponera turneri (Forel, 1910) – Sharkskinned pony ant
Rhytidoponera tyloxys Brown & Douglas, 1958 – Killer pony ant
Rhytidoponera victoriae (André, 1896)
Rhytidoponera violacea (Forel, 1907)
Rhytidoponera viridis (Clark, 1941)
Rhytidoponera yorkensis Forel, 1915

Romblonella
Romblonella heatwolei Taylor, 1991

Solenopsis

Solenopsis belisarius Forel, 1907
Solenopsis clarki Crawley, 1922
Solenopsis froggatti Forel, 1913
Solenopsis fusciventris Clark, 1934
Solenopsis geminata (Fabricius, 1804) – Ginger ant/Tropical fire ant
Solenopsis insculpta Clark, 1938
Solenopsis invicta Buren, 1972 – Red imported fire ant
Solenopsis pachycera (Forel, 1915)

Stereomyrmex
Stereomyrmex anderseni (Taylor, 1991)

Stigmacros

Stigmacros aciculata McAreavey, 1957
Stigmacros acuta McAreavey, 1957
Stigmacros aemula (Forel, 1907)
Stigmacros anthracina McAreavey, 1957
Stigmacros armstrongi McAreavey, 1957
Stigmacros australis (Forel, 1902)
Stigmacros barretti Santschi, 1928
Stigmacros bosii (Forel, 1902)
Stigmacros brachytera McAreavey, 1957
Stigmacros brevispina McAreavey, 1957
Stigmacros brooksi McAreavey, 1957
Stigmacros castanea McAreavey, 1957
Stigmacros clarki McAreavey, 1957
Stigmacros clivispina (Forel, 1902)
Stigmacros debilis Bolton, 1995
Stigmacros elegans McAreavey, 1949
Stigmacros epinotalis McAreavey, 1957
Stigmacros extreminigra McAreavey, 1957
Stigmacros ferruginea McAreavey, 1957
Stigmacros flava McAreavey, 1957
Stigmacros flavinodis Clark, 1938
Stigmacros fossulata Viehmeyer, 1925
Stigmacros froggatti (Forel, 1902)
Stigmacros glauerti McAreavey, 1957
Stigmacros hirsuta McAreavey, 1957
Stigmacros impressa McAreavey, 1957
Stigmacros inermis McAreavey, 1957
Stigmacros intacta (Viehmeyer, 1925)
Stigmacros lanaris McAreavey, 1957
Stigmacros major McAreavey, 1957
Stigmacros marginata McAreavey, 1957
Stigmacros medioreticulata (Viehmeyer, 1925)
Stigmacros minor McAreavey, 1957
Stigmacros nitida McAreavey, 1957
Stigmacros occidentalis (Crawley, 1922)
Stigmacros pilosella (Viehmeyer, 1925)
Stigmacros proxima McAreavey, 1957
Stigmacros punctatissima McAreavey, 1957
Stigmacros pusilla McAreavey, 1957
Stigmacros rectangularis McAreavey, 1957
Stigmacros reticulata Clark, 1930
Stigmacros rufa McAreavey, 1957
Stigmacros sordida McAreavey, 1957
Stigmacros spinosa McAreavey, 1957
Stigmacros stanleyi McAreavey, 1957
Stigmacros striata McAreavey, 1957
Stigmacros termitoxena Wheeler, 1936
Stigmacros wilsoni McAreavey, 1957

Stigmatomma
References:
Stigmatomma exiguum (Clark, 1928)
Stigmatomma glauerti (Clark, 1928)
Stigmatomma gracile (Clark, 1934)
Stigmatomma lucidum (Clark, 1934)
Stigmatomma punctulatum (Clark, 1934)
Stigmatomma smithi (Brown, 1960)
Stigmatomma wilsoni (Clark, 1928)

Strumigenys

Strumigenys alexetrix Bolton, 2000
Strumigenys anchis Bolton, 2000
Strumigenys anderseni Bolton, 2000
Strumigenys anetes Brown, 1988
Strumigenys belua Bolton, 2000
Strumigenys bibis Bolton, 2000
Strumigenys buleru Brown, 1988
Strumigenys chyzeri Emery, 1897
Strumigenys cingatrix Bolton, 2000
Strumigenys cochlearis Brown, 1988
Strumigenys deuteras Bolton, 2000
Strumigenys dysanetes Bolton, 2000
Strumigenys emdeni Forel, 1915
Strumigenys emmae (Emery, 1890)
Strumigenys enanna Bolton, 2000
Strumigenys ferocior Brown, 1973
Strumigenys flagellata (Taylor, 1962)
Strumigenys friedae Forel, 1915
Strumigenys geryon Bolton, 2000
Strumigenys godeffroyi Mayr, 1866
Strumigenys gryphon Bolton, 2000
Strumigenys guttulata Forel, 1902
Strumigenys harpyia Bolton, 2000
Strumigenys jugis Bolton, 2000
Strumigenys juxta Bolton, 2000
Strumigenys karawajewi (Brown, 1948)
Strumigenys lycosa Bolton, 2000
Strumigenys mayri Emery, 1897
Strumigenys membranifera (Emery, 1869)
Strumigenys mesedsura Bolton, 2000
Strumigenys minax Bolton, 2000
Strumigenys miniteras Bolton, 2000
Strumigenys nummula Bolton, 2000
Strumigenys opaca Brown, 1954
Strumigenys orthanetes Bolton, 2000
Strumigenys paranetes Brown, 1988
Strumigenys peetersi Bolton, 2000
Strumigenys perplexa (Smith, 1876)
Strumigenys philiporum Brown, 1988
Strumigenys pnyxia Bolton, 2000
Strumigenys quinquedentata Crawley, 1923
Strumigenys racabura Bolton, 2000
Strumigenys radix Bolton, 2000
Strumigenys segrex Bolton, 2000
Strumigenys semicompta (Brown, 1959)
Strumigenys semirex Bolton, 2000
Strumigenys shattucki Bolton, 2000
Strumigenys sutrix Bolton, 2000
Strumigenys szalayi Emery, 1897
Strumigenys tisisyx Bolton, 2000
Strumigenys undras Bolton, 2000
Strumigenys varanga Bolton, 2000
Strumigenys xenos Brown, 1955
Strumigenys yaleopleura Brown, 1988
Strumigenys zygon Bolton, 2000

Syllophopsis
Syllophopsis australica (Forel 1907)
Syllophopsis sechellensis (Emery, 1894)
Syllophopsis subcoeca (Emery, 1894)

Tapinoma
Tapinoma melanocephalum (Fabricius, 1793) – Ghost ant
Tapinoma minutum Mayr, 1862  – Dwarf pecdicel ant

Technomyrmex

Technomyrmex albipes (Smith, 1861) – White-footed ant
Technomyrmex antonii Forel, 1902
Technomyrmex australops Bolton, 2007
Technomyrmex cedarensis Forel, 1915
Technomyrmex cheesmanae Donisthorpe, 1945
Technomyrmex difficilis Forel, 1892
Technomyrmex furens Bolton, 2007
Technomyrmex jocosus Forel, 1910 – White-footed house ant
Technomyrmex nitens Bolton, 2007
Technomyrmex quadricolor (Wheeler, 1930)
Technomyrmex shattucki Bolton, 2007
Technomyrmex sophiae Forel, 1902
\

Teratomyrmex
Teratomyrmex greavesi McAreavey, 1957
Teratomyrmex substrictus Shattuck & O'Reilly, 2013
Teratomyrmex tinae Shattuck & O'Reilly, 2013

Tetramorium

Tetramorium andrynicum  Bolton, 1977
Tetramorium antipodum  Wheeler, 1927
Tetramorium bicarinatum  (Nylander, 1846) – Guinea ant
Tetramorium capitale  (McAreavey, 1949)
Tetramorium confusum  Bolton, 1977
Tetramorium deceptum  Bolton, 1977
Tetramorium fuscipes  (Viehmeyer, 1925)
Tetramorium impressum  (Viehmeyer, 1925) – Impressive pennant ant
Tetramorium lanuginosum  Mayr, 1870
Tetramorium laticephalum  Bolton, 1977 – Harvester pennant ant
Tetramorium megalops  Bolton, 1977
Tetramorium melleum  Emery, 1897
Tetramorium ornatum  Emery, 1897
Tetramorium pacificum  Mayr, 1870 – Pacific pennant ant
Tetramorium simillimum  (Smith, 1851)
Tetramorium sjostedti  Forel, 1915 – Giant pennant ant
Tetramorium spininode  Bolton, 1977 – Royal pennant ant
Tetramorium splendidior  (Viehmeyer, 1925) – Splended pennant ant
Tetramorium strictum  Bolton, 1977
Tetramorium striolatum  Viehmeyer, 1913 – Common pennant ant
Tetramorium taylori  Bolton, 1985
Tetramorium thalidum  Bolton, 1977
Tetramorium turneri  Forel, 1902
Tetramorium validiusculum  Emery, 1897
Tetramorium viehmeyeri  Forel, 1907
Tetramorium wroughtonii  Forel, 1902

Tetraponera
Tetraponera allaborans (Walker, 1859)
Tetraponera laeviceps (Smith, 1859)
Tetraponera nitida (Smith, 1860) – Toothed black tree-ant
Tetraponera nixa Ward, 2001
Tetraponera punctulata Smith, 1877 – Savanna black tree ant
Tetraponera rotula Ward, 2001
Tetraponera tucurua Ward, 2001

Trichomyrmex

Trichomyrmex destructor (Jerdon, 1851) – introduced species – Singapore ant

Turneria
Turneria bidentata Forel, 1895
Turneria frenchi Forel, 1911
Turneria rosschinga Shattuck, 2011

Vollenhovia
Vollenhovia oblonga (Smith, 1860)

Vombisidris
Vombisidris australis (Wheeler, 1934)
Vombisidris renateae (Taylor, 1989)

Wasmannia
Wasmannia auropunctata (Roger, 1863) – introduced species

Zasphinctus

Zasphinctus asper Brown, 1975
Zasphinctus cedaris Forel, 1915
Zasphinctus clarus (Forel, 1893)
Zasphinctus duchaussoyi (Andre, 1905)
Zasphinctus emeryi (Forel, 1893)
Zasphinctus froggatti Forel, 1900
Zasphinctus imbecilis Forel, 1907
Zasphinctus mjobergi Forel, 1915
Zasphinctus myops Forel, 1895
Zasphinctus nigricans (Clark, 1926)
Zasphinctus occidentalis (Clark, 1923)
Zasphinctus septentrionalis (Crawley, 1925)
Zasphinctus steinheili Forel, 1900
Zasphinctus trux Brown, 1975
Zasphinctus turneri Forel, 1900

Incertae sedis
Species listed below were described in Australia as their type locality, but their true identities remain unknown.

Formica amyoti Le Guillou, 1842
Formica inequalis Lowne, 1865
Formica minuta Lowne, 1865

See also
List of ant genera
List of ant subfamilies

Notes

References

Bibliography

Further reading

External links
Ants are everywhere – Commonwealth Scientific and Industrial Research Organisation
Ants: Family Formicidae – Australian Museum

'
'
Australia
Australia